Leptodeuterocopus sochchoroides is a moth of the family Pterophoridae that is known from Brazil.

Adults are on wing in June.

External links

Deuterocopinae
Moths described in 1910
Endemic fauna of Brazil
Moths of South America